Phitsanulok Football Club (Thai สโมสรฟุตบอลจังหวัดพิษณุโลก), or Phitsanulok Football Club 2015, formerly Phitsanulok TSY Football Club, is a Thai semi professional football club based in city of Phitsanulok in Phitsanulok province. The club currently plays in the Thai League 3 Northern Region.

History
At the beginning of the 2009 season, Bangkok Bank F.C. withdrew from the league before the season began. FAT therefore decided that to fill the league with 16 teams, they would run a pre-season competition featuring the 4 relegated clubs from the Thailand Division 1 League 2008 season. Phitsanulok F.C. were one of these clubs, however, they were beaten by Nakhon Sawan in the semi-final 2–1, therefore relegated to Thai Division 2 League.

During the second leg of the 2011 season the team was renamed to Phitsanulok TSY F.C. after Thai Seng Yont became the main sponsor of the team. After the team's failure in the 2014 season and the resulting relegation to the regional league, the team returned in 2015 under new management and a new name – Phitsanulok F.C. 2015.

Stadium and locations

Season by season record

Season by season record for team B

P = Played
W = Games won
D = Games drawn
L = Games lost
F = Goals for
A = Goals against
Pts = Points
Pos = Final position

QR1 = First Qualifying Round
QR2 = Second Qualifying Round
R1 = Round 1
R2 = Round 2
R3 = Round 3
R4 = Round 4

R5 = Round 5
R6 = Round 6
QF = Quarter-finals
SF = Semi-finals
RU = Runners-up
W = Winners

Club staff

Players

Current squad

Honours

League
Thai League 3 Northern Region
 Winners (1) : 2022–23
 Runner-up (1) : 2021–22

Regional League Northern Division
 Winners (1) : 2011
 Runner-up (2) : 2012, 2013

Thai League 4 Northern Region
 Third Place (2) : 2017, 2018

References 
PHITSANULOK FC SQUAD 2022/2023

ขุนพลนเรศวร เชิญชวนแฟนบอลออกแบบชุดแข่ง

ขุนพลนเรศวร คว้าตัว เซลิโอ้ จาก กูปรีอันตราย

ขุนพลนเรศวร คว้าตัว บังดุล นั่งแท่นโค้ชแอนด์เพลย์เยอร์

บอสต้น เผยความพร้อมตัวผู้เล่น ขุนพลนเรศวร ฤดูกาลหน้า

โหมโรงไทยลีก3 รอบแชมเปี้ยนส์ ลีก โซนบน:พิษณุโลก เอฟซี

External links 
 Official Facebookpage

Football clubs in Thailand
Association football clubs established in 2005
Sport in Phitsanulok province
2005 establishments in Thailand